This article is the index of forestry topics.

A
Afforestation -
Aldo Leopold -
Analog forestry -
Ancient woodland -
Angle gauge -
Appalachian balds -
Arboriculture -
Arborist -
Forestry in Argentina -
Assarting

B
Backpacking (hiking) -
Forestry in Bangladesh -
Bernard Fernow -
Forestry in Bhutan -
Biltmore Forest School -
Biltmore stick -
Biochar -
Biscuit Fire publication controversy -
Bog-wood -
Borderline tree -
Botany -
Bottomland hardwood forest -
British timber trade -
Buchonia -
Buffer strip

C
Caliper -
Canopy research -
Canopy walkway -
Carl A. Schenck -
Cellulosic ethanol -
Certified wood -
Forestry in Chad -
Charcoal -
Clearcutting -
Clinometer -
CODIT -
Community forestry -
Conservation biology -
Coppicing -
Cork -
Creosote -
Cultigen -
Cultivar -
Cultblock

D
Deforestation -
Deforestation during the Roman period -
Dendrochronology -
Desertification -
Diameter tape -
Drunken trees

E
Ecoforestry -
Ecological succession -
Ecological thinning -
Ecological yield -
Eloise Gerry -
Energy forestry -
Forestry in Ethiopia -
Exploration Logging -
Extended rotation forest

F
Faustmann's Formula -
Firewood -
Forbidden Forest -
Forest dwellers -
Forest fire -
Forest farming, the ecosystem approach to forest management -
Forest fragmentation -
Forest governance -
Forest history -
Forest interpretation -
Forest management -
Forest policy -
Forest politics -
Forest Principles -
Forest produce -
Forest protection -
Forest ranger -
Forest transition -
Forester -
Forestry -
Forestry agencies -
Forestry education - 
Forestry journals

G
Georg Ludwig Hartig -
Forestry in Ghana -
Gifford Pinchot -
Girard form class -
Girdling -
Green Chain

H
Hand compass -
Hardwood timber production -
Hemispherical photography -
Hendre-Dru Tramway -
High forest (woodland) -
High grading -
Historic schools of forestry -
Historical Logging Switchback Railway in Vychylovka -
History of the New York State College of Forestry -
Franklin B. Hough -
Hotshot crew -
Hydro axe mulching

I
Illegal logging -
Increment borer -
Independent Forest Monitoring -
Forestry in India -
Interception (water) - 
International Society of Tropical Foresters -
International Year of Forests

J
Forestry in Japan -
Jewish National Fund -
Joint Forest Management -
Journals

K
Károly Bund -
Kerry Tramway -
Krummholz

L
Forestry in Laos -
Leaf Area Index -
Limbing -
Line plot survey -
Living stump -
Log bridge -
Log bucking -
Log driver -
Log scaler -
Logging -
Lumber -
Lumberjack - 
Lumberjack sports -
Lumberjack World Championship

M
Management of Pacific Northwest riparian forests -
Mean annual increment -
Micropropagation -
Multiple Use - Sustained Yield Act of 1960

N
Nalini Nadkarni -
New York State College of Forestry -
New Zealand Journal of Forestry -
Non-timber forest product -
Northwest Forest Plan

O
Old growth forest -
Optimal rotation age

P
Pacing -
Paper -
Patch cut -
Periodic annual increment -
Pollarding -
Pruning -
Pulp and paper industry -
Pulp and paper industry in Canada -
Pulp and paper industry in Europe -
Pulp and paper industry in Japan -
Pulp and paper industry in the United States -
Pulpwood

R
Rainforest -
Reducing emissions from deforestation and forest degradation -
Reforestation -
Relascope -
Research institutes -
Restoration ecology -
Riparian buffer -
Robert Marshall -
Royal Saxon Academy of Forestry -
Natural rubber -
Rubber tapper

S
Sakari Pinomäki -
Salvage logging -
Sawdust -
Sawmill -
Scleroderris canker -
Secondary forest -
Selection cutting -
Shelterwood cutting -
Short rotation coppice -
Short rotation forestry -
Shredding (tree pruning technique) -
Silviculture -
Site index -
Site tree -
Slash-and-char -
Harry A. Slattery -
Smokejumper -
Snag -
Softwood -
Stand Density Index -
Stand density management diagram -
Stemflow -
Stephen C. Sillett -
Stihl Timbersports Series -
Stump harvesting -
Stumpage -
Sustainable forest management -
Kenneth Dupee Swan

T
Tall oil -
Tall Timbers Research Station and Land Conservancy -
Tar -
Technical schools -
Thinning -
Throughfall -
Timber -
Timber rafting -
Timberjack -
Timberlands West Coast Limited -
Town forest -
Tree -
Tree inventory -
Tree preservation order -
Tree shelter -
Tree stump -
Tree taper -
Treethanol -
Treeplanting -
Turpentine - 
Types of formally designated forests

U
Forestry in Uganda -
United Nations Forum on Forests -
Universities and colleges -
Urban forest -
Urban forestry -
Urban reforestation

V
Variable retention harvesting -
Veteran tree -
Volume table

W
Wedge prism -
Whip (tree) -
Wildfire -
Windbreak -
Windthrow -
Wood -
Wood chopping -
Wood fuel -
Wood management -
Wood pellet -
Wood processing -
Woodchipping in New Zealand -
Woodland management -
Woodlot -
Woodsman -
Theodore Salisbury Woolsey, Jr. -
World forestry -
World Logging Championship

Z
Raphael Zon

See also
 

 
Forestry